Prosoplus abdominalis is a species of beetle in the family Cerambycidae. It was described by White in 1858.

References

Prosoplus
Beetles described in 1858